The Wanamaker Grand Court Organ, located in Philadelphia, Pennsylvania (United States of America) is the largest fully-functioning pipe organ in the world, based on the number of playing pipes, the number of ranks and its weight. The Wanamaker Organ  is located within a spacious 7-story Grand Court at Macy's Center City (formerly Wanamaker's department store) and is played twice a day Monday through Saturday. The organ is featured at several special concerts held throughout the year, including events featuring the Friends of the Wanamaker Organ Festival Chorus and Brass Ensemble.

Notable characteristics
The Wanamaker Organ is a concert organ of the American Symphonic school of design, which combines traditional organ tone with the sonic colors of the symphony orchestra. In its present configuration, the instrument has 28,750 pipes in 464 ranks. 

The organ console consists of six manuals with an array of stops and controls that command the organ. The organ's String Division fills the largest single organ chamber in the world. The instrument features eighty-eight ranks of string pipes built to Wanamaker specifications by the W.W. Kimball Company of Chicago. 

The organ is famed for its orchestra-like sound, coming from pipes that are voiced softer than usual, allowing an unusually rich build-up because of the massing of pipe-tone families. The organ was also built and enlarged as an "art organ," using exceptional craftsmanship and lavish application of materials to create a luxury product. 

There is a minimum of borrowing and unification in its disciplined design, except in the Pedal and Orchestral divisions, where it adds genuine value, and duplexing is reserved for when valuable solo voices can be separated from their divisions without tying up the remaining tonal resources of said division. Choruses (16', 8', 4') are true choruses of three ranks, each with their own personality, rather than a single rank electrically "tapped" at three pitches, with the resulting weakening of the octaves and sameness of tone between the voices as found in unification. 

The Wanamaker Store maintained its own organ factory to ensure an ultra-high-grade result. The artistic obligation entailed by the creation of this instrument has always been honored, with two curators employed in its constant and scrupulous care (what leads to the state of one of the best maintained organ in the world). This dedication was enhanced when corporate parentage shifted from the Wanamaker family to Carter Hawley Hale Stores followed by Woodward & Lothrop, The May Department Stores Company, and Lord & Taylor. When the space was occupied by Macy's and with the founding of the Friends of the Wanamaker Organ with its input of outside capital, an aggressive restoration schedule developed and is still maintained.  Current restoration efforts are a combination of Macy's expenditures and significant contributions by Friends of the Wanamaker Organ, a 501(c)3 non-profit dedicated to the instrument.

History

The Wanamaker Organ was originally built by the Los Angeles Art Organ Company, successors to the Murray M. Harris Organ Co., for the 1904 St. Louis World's Fair. It was designed to be the largest organ in the world, an imitation of a full-size orchestra with particularly complete resources of full organ tone including mixtures. In addition to its console, the organ was originally equipped with an automatic player that used punched rolls of paper, according to the Los Angeles Times of 1904. It was built to a specification by renowned organ theorist and architect George Ashdown Audsley. Wild cost overruns plagued the project, with the result that Harris was ousted from his own company. With capital from stockholder Eben Smith, it was reorganized as the Los Angeles Art Organ Company, and finished at a cost of $105,000 (equal to $ today), $40,000 over budget, equal to $ today. The Fair began (in late April 1904) before the organ was fully installed in its temporary home, Festival Hall. Although the organ's debut was scheduled for May 1, official fair organist and St. Louis local Charles Henry Galloway did not give his opening recital until June 9. The organ was still not entirely finished in September of that year, when Alexandre Guilmant, one of the most famous organists of the day, presented 40 very well-attended recitals on the organ.

Following the Fair, the organ was intended for permanent installation by the Kansas City Convention Center.  Indeed, the original console had a prominent "K C" on its music rack.  This venture failed, bankrupting the L. A. Art Organ company after the Fair closed. There was a plan to exhibit the organ at Coney Island in New York City, but nothing came of this.

The organ languished in storage at the Handlan warehouse in St. Louis until 1909, when it was bought by John Wanamaker for his new department store at 13th and Market Streets in Center City, Philadelphia. It took thirteen freight cars to move it to its new home, and two years for installation. It was first played on June 22, 1911, at the exact moment when British King George V was crowned. It was also featured later that year when U.S. President William Howard Taft dedicated the store.

Despite its then-unprecedented size (more than 10,000 pipes), it was judged inadequate to fill the seven-story Grand Court in which it was located, so Wanamaker's opened a private organ factory in the store attic, which was charged with enlarging the organ. The first project to enlarge the organ was the addition of 8,000 pipes between 1911 and 1917.

Wanamaker's sponsored many historic after-business-hours concerts on the Wanamaker Organ. The first, in 1919, featured Leopold Stokowski and the Philadelphia Orchestra with organist Charles M. Courboin. Every sales counter and fixture was removed for the free after-hours event, which attracted an audience of 15,000 from across the United States. Subsequently, more of these "Musicians' Assemblies" were held, as were private recitals. For these events Wanamaker's opened a Concert Bureau under Alexander Russell and brought to America master organists Marcel Dupré and Louis Vierne, Nadia Boulanger, Marco Enrico Bossi, Alfred Hollins, and several others. (This agency, which worked in partnership with Canadian Bernard R. LaBerge, evolved into the Karen McFarlane Concert Agency of the present day.) During his first recital on the organ, Dupré was so impressed with the instrument that he was inspired to improvise a musical depiction of the life of Jesus Christ. This was later published as his Symphonie-Passion.

From April 24, 1922, to 1928 the store had its own radio station, WOO, and music from the organ was a major feature of the broadcasts.

In 1924, a new project to enlarge the organ began. Marcel Dupré and Charles M. Courboin were among those asked by Rodman Wanamaker, John Wanamaker's son, to "Work together to draw up a plan for the instrument. Use everything you have ever dreamed about." They were told there was no limit to the budget. This project resulted in, among other things, the celebrated String Division, which occupies the largest organ chamber ever constructed, 67 feet long, 26 feet deep, and 16 feet high (22 by 9 by 5 m). During this project, the organ's current console was constructed in Wanamaker's private in-house pipe-organ factory, with six manuals and several hundred controls. By 1930, when work on expanding the organ finally stopped, the organ had 28,482 pipes, and, if Rodman Wanamaker had not died in 1928, the organ would probably be even bigger.

Plans were made for, among others, a Stentor division, a section of high-pressure diapasons and reeds. It was to be installed on the fifth floor, above the String Division, and would be playable from the sixth manual. However, it was never funded, and the sixth manual is now used to couple other divisions or play various solo voices from other divisions that are duplexed to this keyboard.

Rodman Wanamaker was not interested in mere size, however, but in artistic organ-building with finely crafted pipes and chests using the best materials and careful artistic consideration. The Wanamaker Organ console, built in the store organ shop by William Boone Fleming, is a work of art in its own right with heavy, durable construction, an ingenious layout of its pneumatic stop action and many unique features and conveniences. Wanamaker also had a collection of 60 rare stringed instruments, the Wanamaker Cappella, that were used in conjunction with the store organs in Philadelphia and New York, and went on tour. They were dispersed after his death.

Following the sale of the store to The May Department Stores Company, in 1995, the Wanamaker's name was removed from the store (first as Wanamaker-Hecht's) in favor of Hecht's, but the organ and its concerts were retained. During the local renaming of the Hecht's stores to Strawbridge's, the historic Wanamaker Store briefly took the name of its longtime rival Strawbridge's. The May Company began a complete restoration of the organ in 1997, as part of the store's final May Co. conversion into a Lord & Taylor. At that time the store area was reduced to three floors and additional panes of glass were put around the Grand Court on floors four and five, greatly enhancing the reverberation of the room.

The Philadelphia Orchestra returned to the Grand Court on September 27, 2008, for the premiere performance of Joseph Jongen's Symphonie Concertante (1926) on the organ for which it was written. The ticketed event, featuring soloist Peter Richard Conte, also included the Bach/Stokowski arrangement of the Toccata and Fugue in D minor, Marcel Dupré's Cortege and Litany for Organ and Orchestra, and the world premiere of a Fanfare by Howard Shore, composer for The Lord of the Rings films. Shore visited the store in May 2008 to meet with Peter Richard Conte and hear the Wanamaker Organ. The Philadelphia Orchestra Concert was co-sponsored by the Friends of the Wanamaker Organ and was a benefit for that organization.

In 2019 the Wanamaker Organ facade, designed by Daniel Hudson Burnham, was restored and re-gilded in 22-karat gold to a color scheme close in sympathy to its original appearance but which fits in with its new surroundings. Evergreene Architectural Arts did the work. Grant money from Macy's and several Philadelphia area charities funded this project, which was overseen by the Friends of the Wanamaker Organ.

Organists
Although numerous famous organists have played special concerts on the organ, it has had only four chief organists in its history:

 Dr. Irvin J. Morgan (1911–1917)
 Mary E. Vogt (1917–1966)
 Dr. Keith Chapman (1966–1989)
 Peter Richard Conte (1989–present)

For about a decade beginning in 1919, Dr. Charles M. Courboin was the organist for a series of special evening concerts, including several collaborations with the Philadelphia Orchestra. Courboin also headed the Wanamaker Organ Shop in the late 1920s.

Noteworthy assistant organists
 Dr. Richard L. Elliott (Chapman)
 Ken Cowan (Conte)
 Nathan Laube (Conte)

Present curator
 Matthew Taft

Music inspired by or written for the Wanamaker Organ

Original compositions
 Premiére Symphonie "Passion" en ré mineur pour Grand-Orgue, op. 23 by Marcel Dupré. Originally improvised.
 Concerto Gregorian by Pietro Yon
 Concerto Romano by Alfredo Casella
 Dedicace by Louis Vierne, dedicated to Rodman Wanamaker
 Symphonie Concertante for organ and orchestra by Joseph Jongen
 Fanfare and Procession by Keith Chapman
 "A Highland Ayre" from "Scottish Folk Tone Poems" by Richard Purvis (written for the Wanamaker Organ at the request of Keith Chapman)
 Cathedral of Commerce by Robert Hebble

Arrangements of existing music
 "Come Sweet Death" by J. S. Bach, arranged after Stokowski by Virgil Fox
 Leopold Stokowski's organ-orchestra transcription of Bach's Passacaglia in C Minor
 Transcription of Mussorgsky's Pictures at an Exhibition by Keith Chapman
 Transcription of Mussorgsky's Night on Bald Mountain by Peter Richard Conte
 Transcription of Dukas' The Sorcerer's Apprentice by Peter Richard Conte
 Transcription of Nicolai's Overture to  The Merry Wives of Windsor by Peter Richard Conte
 Transcription of Elgar's Cockaigne Overture by Peter Richard Conte
 Transcription of Bernstein's "Overture to Candide" by Peter Richard Conte
 Transcription of the Elgar Enigma Variations by Peter Richard Conte
 Transcription of "Der Rosenkavalier Suite" by Peter Richard Conte
 Transcription of Arthur Sullivan's The Yeomen of the Guard Overture by Peter Richard Conte
 Improvisation on a Stokowski-theme by Xaver Varnus

Architectural layout

The pipes are laid out across the space occupied by five floors of the building, with the sections situated as follows:
2nd floor south – Main Pedal 32′, Lower Swell, Great, Percussions
3rd floor south – Main Pedal, Chorus, Upper Swell, Choir/Enclosed Great, Solo, Vox Humana Chorus
4th floor south – String
4th floor west – Orchestral (adjacent to String)
7th floor south – Major Chimes, Ethereal, Chinese Gong
7th floor north – Echo

The 32′ Wood Open, 32′ Diaphone, and 32′ Metal Diapason pipes run the length of a little more than 2 stories, beginning on the second floor.

Stoplist

Main Organ

Ethereal Organ

Echo Organ

Orchestral Organ

String Organ

Stentor Division

Percussion Division

Recordings
 The Grand Court Organ (1973) by Keith Chapman. It included  a number of works demonstrating the full organ
 Mussorgsky’s Pictures at an Exhibition. 1975, the recording is of Keith Chapman's own transcription of the piano suite
 Airs & Arabesques (1976) explored the softer colors of the instrument to marvelous effect
 Virgil Fox Plays the Wanamaker Grand Court Organ (1964, 2004).
 Keith Chapman – The Lost Radio Broadcasts - Vantage V2CD-698-002
 Xaver Varnus' concert 
 Magic! (2001) By Peter Richard Conte
 Wanamaker Legacy (2004) by Peter Richard Conte
 A Grand Celebration: Peter Richard Conte with The Philadelphia Orchestra, recorded 2008
 Wanamaker Organ Centennial Concert: Peter Richard Conte with the Symphony in C, Rossen Milanov, conductor. Recorded 2011. Also available on DVD.
 Midnight in the Grand Court (2004) by Peter Richard Conte
 Christmas in the Grand Tradition by Peter Richard Conte with the Philadelphia Brass Ensemble
 My Heart at Thy Sweet Voice by Peter Richard Conte with Andrew Ennis, Flugelhorn
 Around the Wanamaker Organ in 80 Minutes, Wanamaker DVD (A DVD tour of the organ)
 A Wanamaker Organ Curators Tour through the entire instrument on DVD with curator Curt Mangel and MPR host Michael Barone (Pipedreams).
 A Wanamaker Organ Sonic Odyssey tonal exploration of the entire instrument on DVD with Peter Richard Conte and Yale Organist Thomas Murray.

See also

Curtis Organ
Boardwalk Hall Auditorium Organ

Notes and references

External links

Friends of the Wanamaker Organ
Pipe Dreams radio program, "Peter Conte and the Wanamaker Grand Court Organ"
Grand Court Organ, Wanamaker Dept. Store Philadelphia, PA
Video of the Wanamaker Organ being played by Virgil Fox
The Worlds Largest Musical Instrument: The Wanamaker Organ - Part 1
The Wanamaker Organ Part 2 - The Fine Details
The Wanamaker Organ Part 3 - Routine Maintenance

Landmarks in Philadelphia
Individual pipe organs
Market East, Philadelphia
Wanamaker family